Harlan Mathews (January 17, 1927 – May 9, 2014) was a Democratic United States Senator from Tennessee from 1993 to 1994. He had previously served in the executive and legislative branches of state government in Tennessee for more than 40 years beginning in 1950.

Early life and education
Harlan Mathews was a native of Walker County, Alabama. He was born January 17, 1927, in Sumiton, Alabama, the son of John William Mathews and Lillian (Young) Mathews. In 1944, after high school, he enlisted in the U.S. Navy and served until 1946. Returning to Alabama, he graduated from Jacksonville State College (now Jacksonville State University) with a B.A. degree in 1949.

After graduating, Mathews obtained a master's degree in public administration from Vanderbilt University in 1950. He began work on Governor Gordon Browning's planning staff. When Frank G. Clement was elected in 1954, Mathews moved to the state's budget staff. A year after beginning his service as commissioner of finance and administration in 1961, he completed his law degree in 1962 from the YMCA Night Law School, now Nashville School of Law.

Early political career
Mathews joined the staff of the governor of Tennessee in 1950, serving governors Gordon Browning, Frank G. Clement, and Buford Ellington. From 1961-1971 he served as commissioner of finance and administration.

In January 1971, Mathews left the cabinet and entered the private sector for two years, working for Amcon International in Memphis. In 1973, he became the legislative assistant to longtime Tennessee Comptroller of the Treasury Bill Snodgrass. In 1974, Mathews was elected state treasurer by the Tennessee General Assembly when his predecessor, Tom Wiseman, resigned to run for governor. The Tennessee General Assembly elected him to his first full two-year term as treasurer in 1975, where he served until January 1987, when he became deputy to Governor Ned R. McWherter.

U.S. Senate
In 1993, Governor Ned McWherter appointed Mathews to the U.S. Senate following the resignation of Al Gore, who resigned to serve as Vice President of the United States. Upon appointing Mathews to the senate, McWherter announced Mathews’ role would be one of caretaker, to allow those who wanted to run for the position to prepare their campaigns. Mathews had no ambition of running for election to the U.S. Senate.

In December 1994, Mathews left office and  resumed a law practice in Nashville, Tennessee.

Death
Mathews died of brain cancer on May 9, 2014, at a hospice in Nashville. He was survived by his wife, Pat, and two sons. A third son, Richard Mathews, preceded him in death.

References

 Tennessee Blue Book, 2001-02 Edition

External links
 Senator Harlan Mathews Papers, 1993-1994, Tennessee State Library and Archives.
 Senator Harlan Mathews Papers Addition, 1992-1994, Tennessee State Library and Archives.

1927 births
2014 deaths
People from Walker County, Alabama
Jacksonville State University alumni
Nashville School of Law alumni
Vanderbilt University alumni
Democratic Party United States senators from Tennessee
Tennessee lawyers
State cabinet secretaries of Tennessee
Tennessee Democrats
State treasurers of Tennessee
Deaths from brain cancer in the United States
Deaths from cancer in Tennessee
20th-century American lawyers
United States Navy personnel of World War II